Emmanuel Episcopal Church is located at 380 Pennsylvania Avenue in Elmira, New York.  It is significant for its High Victorian Gothic style of architecture.  The surface of the cast concrete building was cast to resemble rough cut stone.  This church was added to the National Register of Historic Places in November, 1998.

References

External links
 Emmanuel Episcopal Church, Elmira, New York

Churches on the National Register of Historic Places in New York (state)
Gothic Revival church buildings in New York (state)
Episcopal church buildings in New York (state)
 
Churches in Chemung County, New York
National Register of Historic Places in Chemung County, New York